Skowarnki  is a village in the administrative district of Gmina Debrzno, within Człuchów County, Pomeranian Voivodeship, in northern Poland.

The village has a population of 171.

References

See also
 History of Pomerania

Skowarnki